A Marylander is a person from the American state of Maryland.

Marylanders can refer to:

The Marylanders, a doo wop group
Mary Landers (1905–1990), an American mathematician
Marylander (train), a Baltimore and Ohio Railroad (B&O) passenger train